"Crush My Soul" is a song by industrial metal band Godflesh, taken from the album Selfless (1994). It was released in 1995 by Earache Records on 12" vinyl and CD. The single's two remixes were also included on the Selfless/Merciless compilation released on Earache Records in 1996.

Music and critical reception
Regarding the song "Crush My Soul", Godflesh frontman Justin Broadrick said:

Richard Fontenoy, a contributor to Rough Guide to Rock, stated in the book that "Godflesh's breakthrough into metal acceptance has a tendency towards mechanical, headbanging sameness, though the excellent 'Crush My Soul' is based around an asthmatically weaving sample loop." Ned Raggett of AllMusic wrote, "Songs like 'Anything Is Mine' and 'Crush My Soul', the latter infused with a strange breathing rhythm loop, or so it sounds, capture this version of major-label Godflesh pretty well, both unpleasant enough to keep the wimps away and accessible enough to win over the more open-minded." Ira A. Robbins of Trouser Press wrote, "the screaming 'Crush My Soul' demonstrate[s] an incipient sense of melody". Writing for Billboard, Larry Flick praised the single, saying, "Many may misread the passionate plea as angst, but buried deep beneath the cold, isolationist shell is a core with purely positive intentions. Dig for it."

On the "Ultramix" version of the song, The Wire wrote, "Even the rather ponderous industrial menace of Godflesh is transformed in their 'Ultramix' of 'Crush My Soul', although...it's too long."

Music video

Originally, Broadrick wanted to recruit Swiss artist H. R. Giger to direct "Crush My Soul's" music video, but he proved too expensive. The video was ultimately directed by photographer Andres Serrano, who was known for his controversial 1987 photograph Piss Christ. The video, which was Serrano's debut music video, featured the band performing in the Angel Orensanz Synagogue interspersed with clips of cockfighting and religious iconography. Performance artist Bob Flanagan was also featured in the video, portraying an upside down Christ figure hoisted up on a ceiling. The video cost $75,000 to create.

Controversy
In an interview with SHOOT magazine, Serrano said, "I never set out to start any kind of controversy and I'm not foreseeing any kind of controversy with this video―it's not like we are out to prove anything." Regardless, the video drew media attention for its transgressive content. It was subsequently rejected from being aired by MTV, whose acquisitions group felt that "musically there wasn't a home for it at the current time." As a result of the rejection, Earache and Columbia Records changed their strategies into distributing the clip to regional video shows and to The Box, which aired content that MTV found objectionable. Broadrick believed the video's lack of airplay was in part responsible for Columbia abruptly dropping Godflesh.

Influence on Metallica
Godflesh showed the video for "Crush My Soul" to Metallica's Kirk Hammett. According to Broadrick, Hammett loved the video. Metallica later used art by Serrano for the cover of their 1996 album Load. Broadrick, disappointed by not being credited for discovering the artist, said this was no coincidence, and that no one in Metallica knew about Serrano before the "Crush My Soul" video. Later, Hammett praised Godflesh, calling them the heaviest band in the world and citing them as his favorite band.

Track listing
All songs written by Justin Broadrick and G.C. Green.

Notes
 Some releases of "Crush My Soul" misspell "Xnoybis" as "Xynobis".

Personnel
Godflesh
G.C. Green – bass guitar, production
J.K. Broadrick – guitar, vocals, production
Machines – rhythm, samples

Additional personnel
Bob Ludwig – mastering
Jim Welch – publishing

References

External links
"Crush My Soul" on Earache Records

1994 songs
1995 singles
Columbia Records singles
Obscenity controversies in music
Godflesh songs